Aksay Kazakh Autonomous County is an autonomous county under the prefecture-level city of Jiuquan in Gansu Province, China. The county borders Qinghai Province to the south and Xinjiang to the west.

The postal code is 736400.

History 
The Aksai Kazakh Autonomous Region Preparatory Committee was set up in 1953, south of Dunhuang. On April 26, 1954, the Aksai Kazak Autonomous Region was established. In 1955, it was renamed Aksai Kazakh Autonomous County.

Geography 

The county lies on the northern edge of the Tibetan Plateau and has an average elevation of about 3,200 meters.

The county is bordered by the city of Dunhuang to the north, Qinghai to the south, Subei Mongol Autonomous County to the east, and Xinjiang to the west.

The Big Harteng River and the Little Harteng River both flow through the southern portion of the county. The , which actually comprises the Big Sugan Lake and the Little Sugan Lake is located in the county.

Climate 

Administrative divisions 
The county governs one town and three townships.

 is the county's sole town and administrative center.

Demographics 

The county is the only Kazakh autonomous county in the province of Gansu. As of 2005, 41.3% of the county's population were ethnic Kazakhs, up slightly from the 40.7% recorded in 1996. Other ethnic groups in the county include the Han, the Hui, the Uighur, the Tibetans and 6 other ethnic minorities.

Transport 
China National Highway 215 passes through the county, as does Gansu Provincial Highway 314.

Golmud–Dunhuang Railway also passes through the county.

References

External links
XinhuaNet -- Aksay Kazak Autonomous County(in Chinese)

Kazak autonomous counties
County-level divisions of Gansu
Jiuquan